Geert Pijnenburg (23 August 1896 – 12 July 1980), pseudonym Geert Grub was a Belgian poet, writer and Flemish activist.

Bibliography
 Sexologie en levensleer, 1936, Monography
 Het geslachtsleven van man en vrouw in liefde en huwelijk, 1936, Monography
 Gerecht en recht : kritiese bemerkingen op onze rechts- en strafpleging, en bijdrage om tot een betere wijze van recht-doen te komen, 1939, Monography
 Ethiek redt beschaving, 1946  Monography
 Etiek is kultuur, 1970, Monography

Sources
 Geert Pijnenburg

1896 births
1980 deaths
Belgian male poets
Flemish poets
20th-century Belgian poets
20th-century Belgian male writers